Atar is a department  of the Adrar Region in western Mauritania.  The capital lies at Atar. The other villages in the department are Ain Ehel Taya, Tawaz, Azougui and Choum.

References

Departments of Mauritania
Adrar Region